is a train station in the city of Azumino, Nagano Prefecture, Japan, operated by East Japan Railway Company (JR East).

Lines
Minami-Toyoshina Station is served by the Ōito Line and is 10.4 kilometers from the terminus of the line at Matsumoto Station.

Station layout
The station consists of one ground-level side platform serving a single bi-cirectional track. The station is a  Kan'i itaku station.

History
Minami-Toyoshina Station opened on 14 April 1926. With the privatization of Japanese National Railways (JNR) on 1 April 1987, the station came under the control of JR East. A new station building was completed in 2015.

Passenger statistics
In fiscal 2015, the station was used by an average of 867 passengers daily (boarding passengers only).

Surrounding area

Toyoshina High School
Minami-Azumino Toyoshina Agricultural High School

See also
 List of railway stations in Japan

References

External links

 JR East station information 

Railway stations in Nagano Prefecture
Ōito Line
Railway stations in Japan opened in 1926
Stations of East Japan Railway Company
Azumino, Nagano